A statue of Mahatma Gandhi by Kantilal B. Patel stands in Union Square in Manhattan, New York, United States.

Description and history
It was dedicated on October 2, 1986, the 117th anniversary of Gandhi's birth; civil rights leader Bayard Rustin delivered a keynote speech at the ceremony. The statue was removed in 2001, conserved, and reinstalled in a landscaped garden area in 2002.

See also
 1986 in art
 List of artistic depictions of Mahatma Gandhi

References

External links

 Statue of Gandhi Nearing Reality for Union Square by Susan Heller Anderson and David W. Dunlap (July 15, 1986), The New York Times

1986 establishments in New York City
1986 sculptures
Bronze sculptures in Manhattan
Monuments and memorials in Manhattan
Outdoor sculptures in Manhattan
Relocated buildings and structures in New York City
Sculptures of men in New York City
Statues in New York City
New York
Union Square, Manhattan